Camille Iquliq (1963–2005) was an Inuit artist. She began carving in 1984.

Her work is included in the collections of the Government of Nunavut Fine Art Collection and the Musee national des beaux-arts du Quebec.

She died in 2005 as a result of cancer.

References

 1963 births
2005 deaths
20th-century Canadian women artists
Inuit artists
21st-century Canadian women artists